The Swazi are an ethnic group split between South Africa and Eswatini.  The Swazis in South Africa became a major part of South African music, though they were not identified as "Swazi musicians", but rather as "South African musicians"; these included Zacks Nkosi, who began in the 1940s as a jazz musician.

Traditional instruments

 Makhweyane: a single-stringed, gourd-resonated musical bow

References

External links
Download sample ( (Archived 2009-10-31)

Swazi music
South African styles of music